Hadad (Hebrew: הֲדַד), son of Bedad (בְּדַד), was a king of Edom mentioned in the Bible, in Genesis 36:31-43. He succeeded Husham in the apparently elective kingship of the Edomites. He is described as having moved the capital of Edom to Avith, and of defeating the Midianites in Moab. He was succeeded by Samlah of Masrekah.

According to David Mandel, Hadad's rule can be dated to the 10th century BCE.

References

Kings of Edom
Midian
Book of Genesis people